Tetracoscinodon is a genus of mosses belonging to the family Pottiaceae.

The species of this genus are found in New Zealand.

Species:
 Tetracoscinodon irroratus Zander, 1993

References

Pottiaceae
Moss genera